Thompson is an unincorporated community in Audrain County, Missouri, United States.  It is located six miles west of Mexico on Route 22.  The ZIP Code for Thompson is 65285.

A post office called Thompson's Station was established in 1860, and the name was changed to Thompson in 1883. William Tompson, an early postmaster, gave the community his name.

References

Unincorporated communities in Audrain County, Missouri
Unincorporated communities in Missouri